Dame Anne Judith Rafferty,  (born 26 July 1950), is an English jurist, who served as a Lady Justice of Appeal of England and Wales from 2011 to 2020.

On 10 September 2022, Rafferty attended the Accession Council as a Privy Councillor and signed the Proclamation of Accession of King Charles III.

Career
Educated at Wolverhampton Girls' High School and a graduate of the University of Sheffield, Rafferty was the first woman Chair of the Criminal Bar Association. She was appointed Queen's Counsel in 1990 and a Recorder the following year. In 1999, she was promoted Deputy High Court Judge, before her appointment to the High Court of Justice in 2000, when she was assigned to the Queen's Bench Division; she received the customary honour as Dame Commander of the Order of the British Empire (DBE).

In 2011, Rafferty was appointed to the Court of Appeal of England and Wales with effect from 5 July, and was sworn of the Privy Council.

In November 2014, her appointment as Chancellor of the University of Sheffield (her alma mater) was announced, to replace Sir Peter Middleton in Summer 2015.

In 2019, she became known for overturning a lower court decision that Prime Minister Boris Johnson had to face three allegations of misconduct in public office, including a disputed claim that the UK was sending £350m a week to Brussels.

Personal life
Dame Anne Rafferty is married to fellow jurist, Judge Brian Barker KC, the retired Recorder of London; they have four daughters.

References

External links
 Debrett's People of Today

1950 births
Living people
People educated at Wolverhampton Girls' High School
Alumni of the University of Sheffield
English barristers
English King's Counsel
English legal professionals
English women judges
20th-century King's Counsel
21st-century King's Counsel
Queen's Bench Division judges
Dames Commander of the Order of the British Empire
Members of the Privy Council of the United Kingdom
Lady Justices of Appeal
Members of Gray's Inn
20th-century English women
20th-century English people